BBC Elstree Studios may refer to two facilities in Borehamwood, Hertfordshire:
BBC Elstree Centre on Clarendon Road
Elstree Studios (Shenley Road) former film studios used by the BBC